Nauri can refer to:

 Nauri language
 Nauri (tribe), a Baloch tribe living in Iranian Balochistan and Afghani Balochistan